A presenter is a person or organization responsible for the running of a public event, or someone who conveys information on media via a broadcasting outlet. Presenter may refer to:

People 
 News presenter, person who presents news during a news program
 Sports commentator, an announcer who presents analysis of a sporting event
 Radio personality, presenter or announcer on a radio show
 Television presenter, person who introduces or hosts television programs
 Talk show host, presenter of a television or radio talk show
 Disc jockey, person who presents recorded music for a live or radio audience
 Master of ceremonies, host and presenter at a ceremony or staged event
 Weather presenter, person who presents broadcast weather forecasts
 Game show host, (Quizmaster) person who ask questions at quiz game programs

Other 
 Microsoft PowerPoint, formerly known as Presenter
 Adobe Presenter, eLearning software released by Adobe Systems
 Presentation program